Wheeler is an unincorporated community in Webster County, West Virginia, United States.

The community was named after Galloway Wheeler. Located near Wheeler is the Lowther Store, listed on the National Register of Historic Places in 1997.

References

Unincorporated communities in Webster County, West Virginia
Unincorporated communities in West Virginia